Beirut: The Last Home Movie is a 1987, documentary film directed by Jennifer Fox. It follows the life of Gaby Bustros and her family, who live in a 200-year-old mansion in Beirut during the Lebanese Civil War.  The Bustros family, one of the noble families of Beirut, remain in their ancestral home despite the endless war that surrounds them.

Exhibition
The film was screened at the Berlin Film Festival, the London Film Festival, and at INPUT, the International Television Conference. It was broadcast on US television as a Frontline special on PBS in 1991.  The film was awarded the Excellence In Cinematography Award and won the Grand Jury Prize Documentary at the 1988 Sundance Film Festival. It opened at the Film Forum in NYC in 1988 and did a thirty city US theatrical release, distributed by Circle Releasing, before airing as a Frontline Special on PBS in 1990.

Awards

Sundance Film Festival  Grand Jury Prize Best Documentary
Sundance Film Festival  Best Cinematography
Soc. Civile des Aut. - Multimedia Best Screenplay
Women and Cinema Argentina - Press Award
C.I.N.E. - Golden Eagle Award
San Francisco Film Festival - Golden Gate Award
Cinéma du Réel (Paris) - Grand Prix

References

External links

Beirut: The Last Home Movie at Women Make Movies

1987 films
American documentary films
Sundance Film Festival award winners
1987 documentary films
Lebanese Civil War films
Documentary films about families
Documentary films about war
Lebanese documentary films
1980s English-language films
1980s American films